George Morrissey (10 March 1908 – 25 August 1979) was a former Australian rules footballer who played with Carlton and North Melbourne in the Victorian Football League (VFL). His father, George, also played in the VFL for St Kilda.

Morrissey later served in the Royal Australian Air Force during World War II.

Notes

External links 

George Morrissey Jr.'s playing statistics from The VFA Project
George Morrissey's profile at Blueseum

1908 births
1979 deaths
North Melbourne Football Club players
Carlton Football Club players
Coburg Football Club players
Australian rules footballers from Victoria (Australia)